Tau Cygni, Latinised from τ Cygni, is a binary star system in the constellation Cygnus, approximately 69 light years away from Earth. This visual binary system has a period of 49.6 years.

The main star, 4th magnitude GJ 822.1 A, is a yellowish white subgiant star of the spectral type F2IV. It therefore has a surface temperature of 6,000 to 7,500 kelvins and is larger, hotter, and several times as bright as the Sun. Its companion, 6th magnitude GJ 822.1 B, is a yellow main sequence star of the spectral type G0V. It is similar to the Sun in size, surface temperature, and luminosity.

Tau Cygni is classified as a δ Scuti variable.  The magnitude range is given as 3.65 to 3.75, which is the combined magnitude for both components, although the variable component is A.

References

Cygnus (constellation)
Binary stars
Cygni, Tau
Delta Scuti variables
F-type subgiants
G-type main-sequence stars
Cygni, 65
104887
202444
BD+37 4240
8130